Aquaberry Aquarius is the nineteenth  mixtape by American rapper Riff Raff. The album was released on January 30, 2017, by Neon Nation Corporation and BMG Rights Management with distribution handled by Warner Music.

Track listing
All tracks produced by DJ Afterthought.

References

External links
 

2017 mixtape albums
Albums produced by FKi (production team)